Eisendorf is a municipality in the district of Rendsburg-Eckernförde, in Schleswig-Holstein, Germany.

See also

Isaiah Eisendorf (born 1996), American-Israeli basketball player in the Israeli Basketball Premier League

References

Municipalities in Schleswig-Holstein
Rendsburg-Eckernförde